Hans Widmer (born 1947), known also by his pseudonym P.M. (taken from the most common initials in the Swiss telephone directory, mostly spelled in lowercase, p.m.) is a Swiss author. He is best known for his 1983 anarchist / anti-capitalist social utopian book bolo'bolo, published with the paranoia city verlag of Zürich.

bolo'bolo
The title of this book refers to the bolo, or an autonomous community corresponding to the anthropological unit of a tribe (a few hundred individuals).  This would be the basic social unit in an envisioned utopian-ecological future; its name is an example of a word from the constructed language (or rather, a basic vocabulary of about thirty words) called asa'pili.

Works

Books
1980: Weltgeist Superstar, 
1982: Tripura Transfer,  
1983: bolo'bolo (8th ed. 2003), ; English edition 
Karthago, 
1989: Amberland, 
1991: Olten - alles aussteigen (2nd ed. 1995), 
1991: Europa? Aufhören! A Pamphlet, 42 p., 
1992: Europa 
1994: Kraftwerk 1 co-author with Martin Blum & Andreas Hofer. Paranoia City, Zürich, 
1994: Lego 
1996: Die Schrecken des Jahres 1000, Rotpunktverlag,  
1997: Kumbi. Die Schrecken des Jahres 1000, Band 2 Rotpunktverlag, 
1998: Agbala dooo!,    
1999: Pukaroa. Die Schrecken des Jahres 1000, Dritter Band Rotpunktverlag, 
2000: Subcoma,  
2007: AKIBA (English and German), 
2008: Neustart Schweiz – So geht es weiter (ed. Christoph Pfluger). Edition Zeitpunkt, Solothurn 2008, 
2012: Manetti lesen oder vom guten Leben. A novel Edition Nautilus, Hamburg 2012, 
2012: Kartoffeln und Computer. Märkte durch Gemeinschaften ersetzen. Edition Nautilus, Hamburg 2012,

Theater performances
 Die Geburt einer Maschine, uraufgeführt: Rote Fabrik, Zürich 1984
 LEGO, Zürich 1994

Radio drama
 Tucui, Schweizer Radio DRS, 1983

See also

References

Further reading

Martin d'Idler. »bolo'bolo« (1983) von P. M. (in German), UTOPIE kreativ, H. 205 (November 2007), 1066-1071,

External links
Paranoiacity.ch
Baraka.de
Cosmotop.de
Lyber-eclat.net

Eipcp.net

1946 births
Living people
Swiss anarchists
Swiss anti-capitalists
Swiss male writers
Constructed language creators